Walter E. Lonergan (September 22, 1885 – January 23, 1958) was a second baseman in Major League Baseball who played briefly for the Boston Red Sox during the  season. He was born in Boston, Massachusetts.

In a 10-game career, Lonergan was a .269 hitter (7-for-26) with two runs, one RBI, and one stolen base. He did not have any extra-base hits. In nine fielding appearances, he committed three errors in 39 chances for a .923 fielding percentage.

Walter Lonergan married Marguerite (Pegler-) Lonergan and had two sons Walter Mansfield Lonergan born in 1922 and Donald Joseph Lonergan born on May 23, 1935. Lonergan died in Lexington, Massachusetts, on September 6, 2005 at age 72.

See also
1911 Boston Red Sox season

External links

Retrosheet

Boston Red Sox players
Major League Baseball second basemen
Baseball players from Boston
1885 births
1958 deaths
Brockton Shoemakers players
Lowell Grays players
Portland Duffs players